Myron Lynn Lapka (born May 10, 1956 in Van Nuys, California) is a former American football defensive tackle in the National Football League. He was drafted by the New York Giants in the 3rd round of the 1980 NFL Draft. Lapka played college football at Southern California.

References

Living people
1956 births
USC Trojans football players
New York Giants players
Los Angeles Rams players
American football defensive tackles